Lake Wolsey is a lake located on Manitoulin Island in Ontario, Canada.

See also
List of lakes in Ontario

References
 National Resources Canada

Lakes of Manitoulin Island